John Caldwell Calhoun (March 18, 1782 – March 31, 1850) was a Democrat, statesman and politician from Abbeville, South Carolina. Calhoun served within several positions inside state and federal governments. He is most notably remembered for his tenure as vice president from 1825 to 1832, serving under both John Quincy Adams and Andrew Jackson from 1825 to 1832. Calhoun was known was for his staunch defense of slavery inside the United States. He led the pro-slavery faction inside the Senate, fighting against abolition and wanted to expand slavery westward in the United States. Calhoun's most infamous words in his political career was in defense of slavery.  Many southern politicians excused slavery as a "necessary evil"; however, in a speech on the Senate floor on February 6, 1837, Calhoun defended slavery as a "positive good." On March 31, 1850, John C. Calhoun died of tuberculosis at the Old Brick Capitol boarding house in Washington, D.C.

After Calhoun's death, white Charlestonians wanted to dedicate a monument in his honor. As of June 2020, the monument no longer stands. It was taken down in a unanimous vote by Charleston city council. Over the monument's 120-year-plus history, controversy has been present with fundraising, construction, maintenance, and the dismantlement of the John C. Calhoun monument.

The "Ladies' Calhoun Monument Association" and the 1887 John C. Calhoun statue  
Soon after John C. Calhoun's death on March 31, 1850, the "Ladies' Calhoun Monument Association," otherwise known as the "LCMA," began its campaign to erect a monument to the South Carolina politician.

A constitution was framed and adopted by the association in 1850, proclaiming that their goal was "to aid in the erection, in or near the City of Charleston, of a monument sacred to the memory of John C. Calhoun." However, the campaign did not start off successfully. The association ran into several fundraising issues, such as embezzlement and lack of preparedness. The association in order to pay for the statue held several donor meetings and depended heavily on wealthy Charlestonian philanthropists to reach the appropriate amount.

Over 27 years later, in April 1887, the Ladies Calhoun Monument Association celebrated the first erection of the monument. Parades and celebrations were hosted all across the city, and LCMA helped unveil the statue to those in attendance. The LCMA described the unveiling ceremony's attendance as "crowded to [Marion Square's] boarders with such an assemblage as is rarely seen anywhere."  Soon after the unveiling was made, prayers and joys were shouted for protection over the newly erected Calhoun monument.

The statue did not last longer than two decades. Freedmen and women of Charleston began to damage the statue in protest; soon after its erection, the statue barely resembled anything like John C. Calhoun. This brought the LCMA back to beginning in terms of setting up new plans to keep the monument out of the public's general reach.

While not being formally mentioned on any portion of the monument, the purpose of this statue was to serve as a reminder to black Charlestonians. According to Mamie Garvin Fields, born in 1888, she later stated, "I believe white people were talking to us about Jim Crow through that statue." Several other black Charlestonians felt that the statue was a threatening message to them: that even though Calhoun was dead, his spirit still lingered in the streets Charleston, South Carolina.

The 1896 John C. Calhoun Statue

The longest-standing version of the statue was dedicated by the LCMA on June 27, 1896, but with little fanfare. There was no mention of the new monument in that day's edition of the Post and Courier, a local newspaper in Charleston. According the "Ladies Calhoun Monument Association," the statue cost nearly $20,000 in 1896 (roughly $500,000 in 2020 dollars). The individual who completed the 1896 monument was an Irish-born contractor, Daniel A. J. Sullivan, who is listed as a carpenter by trade and eventually became a prominent builder in Charleston after the American Civil War. Sullivan was noticeably active in the local Democratic Party and later served in the state legislature. During 1896, it most likely assumed that African-American workers constructed the monument. According to data compiled by historian Bernard Powers, African-Americans in Charleston consisted as much as 76% of carpenters, 85% of its brick and stonemasons, 90% of draymen, and 87% of its labors.

Throughout the next 120 years, while Charleston, South Carolina, especially Marion Square, changed, the monument did not. The statue became controversial for its depiction of a pro-slavery politician, especially in the aftermath of the shooting at the Emanuel African Methodist Episcopal Church.

Final years

During the summer of 2020, several monuments and statues depicting "lost cause" rhetoric, or individuals who enslaved Africans, were taken down in protest across the United States. The John C. Calhoun monument had for years served as problematic issue for Charleston. In 2017, a committee was formed to consider how citizens could interpret the statue. The committee was tasked to create a plaque putting the state in greater historical context. The verbiage of the plaque was never agreed upon, and the committee was disbanded.

On June 23, 2020, after a 17-hour removal effort, the John C. Calhoun statue was taken down from its 115-foot perch. The current location of the John C. Calhoun bust is undisclosed. Some groups have called for the statue to be placed inside a museum. However, the Charleston Museum declined the city's request. As of October 2020, the statue has still not been claimed by any museum or historical society.

See also
 List of monuments and memorials removed during the George Floyd protests

References

Buildings and structures in Charleston, South Carolina
John C. Calhoun
Monuments and memorials in South Carolina
Monuments and memorials removed during the George Floyd protests
Outdoor sculptures in South Carolina
Sculptures of men in South Carolina
Statues in South Carolina
Vandalized works of art in South Carolina
Statues removed in 2020